The Vancouver International Jazz Festival is an annual summer event in Vancouver, British Columbia, Canada.

The festival grew out of a local jazz scene that centred on Vancouver Co-op Radio (CFRO-FM), a community radio station, in the early 1980s. The Pacific Jazz and Blues Association was formed in 1984 and hosted the Pacific Jazz and Blues Festival, which showcased regional jazz and blues artists in addition to some international jazz musicians. By 1986, the group had changed its name to the Coastal Jazz and Blues Society, secured corporate sponsorship, and partnered with Expo 86 to produce the first annual Vancouver International Jazz Festival. The inaugural festival included performances by Miles Davis, Wynton Marsalis, Bobby McFerrin, Tito Puente, Tony Williams, Albert Collins, and John Mayall and the Bluesbreakers. Many Vancouver jazz artists have also performed at the festival including Brad Turner, Jodi Proznick, Laila Biali, John Stetch, Cory Weeds, Vince Mai, Bill Coon, Oliver Gannon, Daniel Hersog, Steve Kaldestad, and Alan Matheson. 

The jazz festival has been held every year since, becoming the largest such festival in British Columbia. Over 1,000 volunteers help in producing the event, which includes performances in parks, community centres, concert halls, clubs, public plazas, and in streets of various neighbourhoods. In total, the festival includes 400 individual performances, including 130 free concerts, and it draws 460,000 people each year.

Sounds of Youth Stage
During the annual festival, the Sounds of Youth stage features big bands from local high schools including Semiahmoo Secondary School, St. Thomas Aquinas Regional Secondary School, St. Thomas More Collegiate, and Langley Fine Arts School.

Past Lineups
2019 - 2020
 Melissa Aldana
 Jacob Collier
 Hiromi Uehara
 Jazzmeia Horn
 Brad Turner (musician)
 Herbie Hancock
 The Roots
 Wu-Tang Clan
 Laila Biali
 Too Many Zooz
 John Stetch

2018 - 2019
 Donny McCaslin
 Brad Turner (musician)
 Julian Lage
 Kamasi Washington
 Cherry Glazerr
 Ghost-Note (band)
 Nels Cline
 Dirty Projectors

References

External links 

Jazz festivals in Canada
Music festivals in Vancouver
1986 establishments in British Columbia
Music festivals established in 1986